Mihajlo "Miško" Jovanović (Serbian Cyrillic: Михајло Мишко Јовановић; 15 June 1878 – 3 February 1915) was a Bosnian Serb who was involved in the assassination of Archduke Franz Ferdinand of Austria.

He was a Narodna Odbrana agent who aided the assassins of Young Bosnia. On 3 February 1915, he was executed by Austria-Hungary, along with Danilo Ilić and Veljko Čubrilović.

References

Literature
 
 

1878 births
1915 deaths
Assassination of Archduke Franz Ferdinand of Austria
Austro-Hungarian rebels
Bosnia and Herzegovina people of World War I
Burials at Holy Archangels Cemetery, Sarajevo
Executed Bosnia and Herzegovina people
People executed by Austria-Hungary
People from Tuzla
Serbs of Bosnia and Herzegovina
Young Bosnia